Srinath Mahesh Maddumage (born 16 October, 1963 as ශී‍්‍රනාත් මද්දුමගේ) [Sinhala]), is an actor in Sri Lankan cinema, stage drama and television. Maddumage is known for the roles in films Diya Yata Gindara, Sonduru Dadabima and Kosthapal Punyasoma.

Personal life
He is a past pupil of Prince of Wales' College, Moratuwa. While in school, he started acting under Gurudeva Tissa Gunawardena. During that time, he played the titular role in stage play Pandukabhaya directed by Simon Navagattegama. Maddumage has an external degree and diploma in Journalism from the University of Sri Jayewardenepura.

He is married to Sriyani Jayawickrema, who is a PhD graduate in Water Management. the couple currently live in Epping, Victoria, Australia. They have one daughter, Menuri Chamathka.

Acting career
After secondary education, Maddumage studied theater and drama under teachers like Solamon Fonseka and Rudi Corrence. His maiden stage drama acting came through Monarawilak. He has acted in many teledramas directed by Nalan Mendis including Nedeyo, Sathpura Wasiyo and Sooriya Daruwo. He acted in stage drama Padhada Asapuwa by Sriyantha Mendis which got the opportunity to travel to 13 countries in Europe for staging the drama. Then in 1984, he acted in first television serial, Kathandara Pituwa and then in Watamaluwa. In 1985, he won a merit award at the Youth Award Festival for the role in play Vikalpa Samayama. He won the award for the Best Supporting Actor for his role in serial Depath Nai at Sumathi Awards.

Maddumage started his film career with Ayoma back in 1995, directed by Parakrama Niriella with a minor role. In 1999, he was nominated for the award for Best Upcoming Actor at Sarasaviya Awards for the role in film Gini Avi Saha Gini Keli.

Notable television works

 Bonikko
 Daruwange Ammala
 Depath Nai
 Duvili Maliga
 Kotipathiyo
 Ingammaruwa
 Itu Devi Vimana
 Kaha Ira Pamula
 Keetaya 5
 Kulawanthayo
 Mathaka Sulanga
 Maya Mansala
 Mihimadala Giniganie
 Nedeyo
 Punchi Weerayo
 Sandagira 
 Sathpura Wasiyo
 Senehewanthayo
 Sooriya Daruwo
 Suba Saha yasa
 Surya Vinsathi
 Visi Ekwana Horawa
 Wansakkarayo

Notable theater works

 Padhada Asapuwa
 Suba Saha Yasa
 Ashawe Veedi
 Warrantuwa
 Nissabdha Venu

Beyond acting
He worked in Peter Maccallum Cancer Hospital in Melbourne. Also he is a story teller for Sri Lankan children which is attached to 'Hume library' in Melbourne. He started a monthly newspaper with 40 pages named Sannasa along with another Sri Lankan Jagath J. Edirisinghe. In television, he presented the programs Rhythm Chat, Gee Hatha. He performed in the visual for song Sanda Sakki Kiyapu Den by Nirosha Virajini. He is also an active member of Alcoholic and Drug Prevention Society. In 2018, he produced the stage drama Hadannama Ba.

He is very popular for conducting muppet shows such as Rusara Vindana, Kele Kade, Sudu Pancha, Hichchi Pinchi (Ran Pancha) and Panchai Pinchei for channels like Rupavahini, ITN, Swarnawahini. In 1998, he won awards at the Asian Muppet Festival held at Seoul, Korea.

He also worked as a Video Production co-ordinator at Alcohol & Drug Information Center (ADDICT).

Filmography

Awards and accolades
He has won several awards at the local stage drama festivals and television festivals.

Sumathi Awards

|-
|| 1995 ||| Depath Nai || Best Supporting Actor ||

State Drama Festival

|-
|| 1985 ||| Warenthuwa || Best Supporting Actor ||

References

External links
 Chat with Srinath Maddumage

Sri Lankan male film actors
Sinhalese male actors
Living people
1963 births